Wheeler & Woolsey were an American vaudeville comedy double act who performed together in comedy films from the late 1920s. The team comprised Bert Wheeler (1895–1968) of New Jersey and Robert Woolsey (1888–1938) of Illinois.

Collaboration and background
The Broadway theatre performers were initially teamed as the comedy relief for the 1927 Broadway musical Rio Rita, and came to Hollywood to reprise these roles for the film version. The film's success convinced them to become a permanent team, and they continued to make very popular comedy feature films from 1930 until 1937, all for RKO Radio Pictures—except the 1933 Columbia Pictures release So This Is Africa (which was made during a contract dispute with RKO).

Curly-haired Bert Wheeler played an ever-smiling innocent, who was easily led and not very bright, but who would also sometimes display a stubborn streak of conscience. Bespectacled Robert Woolsey played a genially leering, cigar-smoking, fast-talking idea man who often got the pair in trouble. The vivacious Dorothy Lee usually played Bert's romantic interest.

The Wheeler & Woolsey movies are loaded with joke-book dialogue, original songs, puns, and sometimes racy double-entendre gags:

Woman (coyly indicating her legs): Were you looking at these?
Woolsey: Madam, I'm above that.

Woolsey (worried about a noblewoman): She's liable to have us beheaded.
Wheeler: Beheaded?! Can she do that?
Woolsey: Sure, she can be-head. (i.e., "She can be had.")

Flirt: Sing to me!
Wheeler: How about "One Hour with You"?
Flirt: Sure! But first, sing to me!

Such double-entendre gags were a hallmark of early W&W comedies, although they were severely curtailed after the reconstitution of the Production Code in 1934. Dressing in drag and other forms of gender inversion were also staples of their films.

By 1931 Wheeler & Woolsey were so popular that RKO attempted to generate twice the Wheeler & Woolsey income by making two solo pictures—one with Wheeler (Too Many Cooks) and one with Woolsey (Everything's Rosie). This experiment failed, and they returned to performing as a team. Among the team's features are The Cuckoos (based on Clark and McCullough's Broadway show The Ramblers), Caught Plastered, Peach O'Reno, Diplomaniacs,  and Hips Hips Hooray and Cockeyed Cavaliers (both 1934, both co-starring Thelma Todd and Dorothy Lee, and both directed by Mark Sandrich just before he was promoted to the Fred Astaire-Ginger Rogers musicals). Sandrich was replaced by George Stevens.

After Stevens left the series, the team faltered. In some of these later films Bert and Bob do not even appear as a team, but as strangers who encounter each other by chance. Woolsey's health deteriorated in 1936, and after struggling to complete High Flyers in 1937, he was no longer able to work; he died of kidney disease on October 31, 1938, ending the partnership.

In the early 1940s, after Woolsey had died, Wheeler struggled to restart his career and asked Dorothy Lee to tour with him in vaudeville. She agreed to help her old friend.

In 1945, Wheeler headlined briefly with Jackie Gleason at Slapsy Maxie's, and would later appear on Gleason's Cavalcade of Stars TV program.

Wheeler continued to work off and on through the 1960s. His later appearances were mostly on television; his last theatrical films were two slapstick shorts for Columbia Pictures, filmed in 1950 and produced by Jules White. In 1955 Wheeler co-starred with Keith Larsen in the CBS western series Brave Eagle; Wheeler played the halfbreed Smokey Joe, known for his tall tales and tribal wisdom.

Wheeler also starred with John Raitt and Anne Jeffreys in the Broadway musical Three Wishes for Jamie in 1952, and continued to perform in summer stock theater and in nightclubs, either alone or with a partner (first writer-comedian Hank Ladd, later comedian-singer Tom Dillon).

The duo, although largely forgotten now, were at the peak of their careers in the 1930s and were the biggest inspiration to the British team of Morecambe and Wise.

Availability

Nine of the 21 movies the duo made together were released in a DVD collection titled "Wheeler & Woolsey: RKO Comedy Classics Collection" in March 2013 by Warner Archive. Rio Rita made its way to DVD in February 2006. Girl Crazy and Peach O'Reno were released as a two disc set in December 2010. Four additional W&W films were released individually through the Warner Archive in May 2012: The Rainmakers; Diplomaniacs; On Again-Off Again; and Kentucky Kernels (the latter receiving a Blu-Ray release on September 8, 2020).

Warner Archives released the "RKO Comedy Classics Collection Vol. 2" in October 2016.  This includes six films: Too Many Cooks (Wheeler only); Everything's Rosie (Woolsey only); Dixiana; The Cuckoos; Cockeyed Cavaliers; and Silly Billies.

So This Is Africa has yet to be released on DVD.

Three films have fallen into the Public Domain (Dixiana, Half Shot at Sunrise, and Hook, Line and Sinker). Dixiana was first made available on DVD in its complete version (including the Technicolor sequence) by the Roan Group (currently distributed through Troma) after Cary Roan was able to locate color elements. This release suffers from problematic framing.

Filmography

Notes

External links

 
 
 
 
  The Official Dorothy Lee, Wheeler & Woolsey Tribute
 Wheeler & Woolsey Fan Page
  Wheeler and Woolsey: The Vaudeville Comic Duo and Their Films, 1929-1937 by Edward Watz at McFarland Books
 
 

American comedy duos
American male film actors
Film duos
Vaudeville performers
Burials at Calvary Cemetery (Queens)